The Varna University of Management (abbr. ВУМ) is an international university located in Varna, Bulgaria.

Its primary campus is in Varna. The university awards bachelor's and master's degrees in the fields of business and marketing, information technology, tourism, hospitality management, and culinary arts.

References

External links 
Vum.bg
vumk.eu (old website, information may be outdated)

Universities and colleges in Varna, Bulgaria
Educational institutions established in 1996